The UC Davis Marching Band, organized in the fall of 2019, is the official University of California, Davis marching band. It is the successor to the student-run California Aggie Marching Band-uh!, which existed from the 1920s to 2019. In 2018, the  Band-uh had roughly 250 members.  It performed at home and away games to cheer on the UC Davis Aggies sports teams, marched in parades, and played at events on the UC Davis campus as well as in the surrounding Davis community.

UC Davis administrators ordered the permanent dissolution of the Band-uh in the fall of 2019, after accusations of repeated misconduct and an investigation by an outside law firm.  At the same time, the university announced formation of a new, university administered organization with the name "UC Davis Marching Band."

History 
The original UC Davis marching band dates back to 1922, when E. H. Barger of the school's veterinary science department formed an 18-member group. That band disbanded after interest waned.

The next incarnation of the band was formed in 1929 by J. Price Gittinger as a pep band for the home football games. There were 15 original members, all male. The first female members joined within two years. In the 1960s, the student body voted to exclude women from the Band-uh! after no women showed up for a game, although also allegedly to give the band a rowdier, more masculine spirit. During the women's rights movement in the early 1970s, pressure mounted to reopen the band to women, in part to comply with Title VII of the Civil Rights Act of 1964. By 1973, the Band-uh! once again had female members.

The Band-uh! has been occasionally associated with controversial and obscene antics. It was reprimanded several times in the 1970s. In 1992 the band was put on probation after a sexual harassment charge was made against the student director. In 2008, the staff director of the band, who is not a student, filed a sexual harassment complaint to the university after several incidents involving the removal of shirts, offensive language and gestures, and lewd behavior. In October, 2008, he left temporarily on a "leave of absence because of all the band stress." On April 4, 2019, The California Aggie newspaper published an article citing former Band-uh! members' experiences with hazing, sexual assault, and other forms of misconduct.

The Band-uh! has released two albums of its music, Barn Party in 1998 and Noise Violation in 2002. The band's catalog was composed of its traditional marching songs, such as the "Aggie Fight" song, as well as renditions of popular rock songs such as Green Day's "Welcome to Paradise", Edgar Winter's "Frankenstein", and Jefferson Airplane's "White Rabbit", among many others.

Around April 2019, multiple accusations of hazing, sexual assault, and general misconduct instigated by current members of the now-dissolved Band-uh! and some of its alumni led to an investigation into the band's traditions and their true nature. Five months later, in September 2019, the UC Davis administration issued a public statement officially declaring that the student-run Band-uh! would "no longer exist" and would restructure the marching band completely, with strict oversight, a faculty director, and an entirely new constitution.

The newly formed 'UC Davis Marching Band' made their public performance debut on September 28, 2019, at a home football game against Montana.

Structure 
The Band-uh had an officer council which consisted of 12 student officers, such as the Drum Major, Student Director, and Manager (the Big Three), among others all being equal for voting rights in council meetings. Officers were elected by their peers every year, and served 1 or 2 year terms with the second year requiring a second election. The officer council worked in conjunction with the Faculty director to manage the band. Each section in the band also had 2 section leaders, who managed their sections and were a point of contact between the officer council and the general members.

Participation in the Band-uh was open to any student of UC Davis as well as UCD Staff and community members upon approval of the officer council. There was no audition in order to join, and musicians of all experience levels were accepted. The band was an entirely volunteer organization, and members were not compensated by units or scholarship money of any kind.

For football games and parades, the Band-uh wore their formal, blue and gold, "full dress" marching uniforms. For other sports games and most other gigs, members wore their more casual white collared shirt, blue jeans, and button-laden floppy hat outfits, known as the Mav'rik Band uniform. In 2009, the band received new, custom-made full dress uniforms to replace the ones provided for by Warren Mooney in the late 1970s.

Instrumentation 
There were 10 instrument sections within the CAMB: Flutes (flutes and piccolos), Nets (clarinets), Altos (alto saxophones), Tenors (tenor saxophones), Baritax (baritone saxophones and baritone horns), Trumpets, Mellos (mellophones), Bones (trombones), Sousies (sousaphones), and Drums (snare drums, bass drums, cymbals, and glockenspiels).

Traditions 
The announcement used to present the Band-uh! at every Aggie home game was usually as follows, with occasional minor variations:

Pre 2019 Announcement 
Fast, furious, and foaming at the mouth,
Bold, blue, and bitchin',
It's the pride of the Regents of the University of California,
The spirit of the Davis Campus,
The California Aggie Marching Band-uh!

UC Davis Marching Band version 2019 and onward 
Fast, furious, and foaming at the mouth,
Bold, blue, and blazin',
It's the pride of the Regents of the University of California,
The spirit of the Davis Campus,
It‘s the UC Davis, Marching Band!

References

External links
Cal Aggie Marching Band-uh!
Cal Aggie Marching Band-uh! on the Davis Wiki

College marching bands in the United States
UC Davis Aggies
Musical groups from California
Musical groups established in 1929
1929 establishments in California